Jimmie Taylor (born September 3, 1995) is an American professional basketball player for Debreceni EAC of the Hungarian First League. He played college basketball at Alabama.

College career
Taylor played four seasons for the Alabama Crimson Tide and played in 133 career games (2nd-most in school history) with 99 starts. Over the course of his collegiate career, he averaged 4.7 points, 4.2 rebounds and 1.5 blocked shots per game. Taylor finished sixth all-time in blocks in Crimson Tide history, recording 205 blocks during his collegiate career.

Professional career

Sioux Falls Skyforce
Taylor was drafted with the eighth pick in the second round of the 2017 NBA G League draft by the Sioux Falls Skyforce. In his first season of professional basketball, Taylor averaged 7.0 points, 5.5 rebounds, and 1.9 blocks over 28 games.

Panionios
Taylor signed with Panionios of the Greek Basket League (GBL) on September 20, 2018. Following disciplinary issues, he parted ways with the team on February 4, 2019, after averaging 7 points and 5.3 rebounds in 16 games.

Spójnia Stargard
Taylor signed with Spójnia Stargard of the Polish Basketball League (PLK) on March 15, 2019, through the end of the season. Taylor averaged 10.8 points, 8.4 rebounds, and 1.4 blocks per game in 8 PLK games as Spójnia finished 13th in the PLK standings.

Meralco Bolts
On June 14, 2019, Taylor signed with the Meralco Bolts of the Philippine Basketball Association as a replacement for Gani Lawal as the team's import for the 2019 PBA Commissioner's Cup. Taylor was released after appearing in one game for the Bolts, scoring 13 points and grabbing 18 rebounds in a loss to TNT KaTropa, after the team reinstated Lawal.

Start Lublin
On September 25, 2019, Taylor returned to the PLK after signing with Start Lublin. Taylor averaged 9.4 points and was second in the PLK in rebounds and sixth in blocks, averaging 8.7 rebounds and 1.1 blocks in 22 games until the season was ended early due to the coronavirus pandemic.

Chalons-Reims
On June 29, 2020, Taylor signed with Champagne Châlons-Reims Basket of the French LNB Pro A.

Return to Start Lublin
On June 29, 2021, Taylor signed for a second stint with Start Lublin of the Polish Basketball League.

References

External links
Alabama Crimson Tide bio
RealGM Profile
EuroBasket Profile

1995 births
Living people
Alabama Crimson Tide men's basketball players
American expatriate basketball people in Greece
American expatriate basketball people in the Philippines
American expatriate basketball people in Poland
American men's basketball players
Basketball players from Alabama
Centers (basketball)
Meralco Bolts players
Panionios B.C. players
People from Greensboro, Alabama
Philippine Basketball Association imports
Sioux Falls Skyforce players
Spójnia Stargard players
Start Lublin players
Debreceni EAC (basketball) players
American expatriate basketball people in Hungary
American expatriate basketball people in France
Champagne Châlons-Reims Basket players